BT.1120 is a digital interface standard for HDTV studio signals published by the International Telecommunication Union.   , the current version of BT.1120 is BT.1120-8.

References

Video signal
Film and video technology
High-definition television
Television technology
Television terminology